The Pakistan national cricket team toured the West Indies from February to April 1977 and played a five-match Test series against the West Indies cricket team which the West Indies won 2–1. Pakistan were captained by Mushtaq Mohammad; West Indies by Clive Lloyd.

The series was recognised as one of the finest of that era where West Indies managed to clinch it by 2/1 after nearly escaping a defeat in first game at Barbados. It was memorable for debut of Colin Croft who picked 33 wickets in his debut series along with Joel Garner who too picked 25 wickets in his debut series. At the time, Pakistani skipper Mushtaq accused debutant Garner of illegal action although the claim was later found to be bogus.

West Indies defeat at Trinidad was their last in West Indies till 1988 again by Pakistan at Boruda

Test series summary

First Test

Second Test

Third Test

Fourth Test

Fifth Test

Guinness Trophy

Only ODI

References

External links

1977 in Pakistani cricket
1977 in West Indian cricket
1976-77
International cricket competitions from 1975–76 to 1980
West Indian cricket seasons from 1970–71 to 1999–2000